The name Musicor may represent any of the following:

 Musicor Records -- an American record label.
 Distribution Musicor -- a Canadian record label unrelated to the above; see Distribution Select.